Stirling Bridge carries the Stirling Highway over the Swan River, linking the suburbs of North Fremantle and East Fremantle in Perth, Western Australia.

History
Built by  Clough and Son, it was officially opened by Premier Charles Court on 17 May 1974.

References

External links

Bridges completed in 1974
Buildings and structures in Fremantle
Road bridges in Perth, Western Australia
Stirling Highway
Swan River (Western Australia)
1974 establishments in Australia